Aidan Zittersteijn (born 8 September 1999) is a Cook Island international lawn bowler.

Bowls career
He was born in New Plymouth, New Zealand and was selected as part of the Cook Islands team for the 2018 Commonwealth Games on the Gold Coast in Queensland where he reached the semi finals of the Pairs with Taiki Paniani. They then claimed a bronze medal after defeating Malta in the play off to win the first ever medal for the nation.

In 2019, he won a gold medal at the Pacific Games in the fours event. In 2022, he competed in the men's triples and the men's fours at the 2022 Commonwealth Games.

References

1999 births
Living people
Bowls players at the 2018 Commonwealth Games
Bowls players at the 2022 Commonwealth Games
Commonwealth Games medallists in lawn bowls
Commonwealth Games medallists for the Cook Islands
Sportspeople from New Plymouth
Medallists at the 2018 Commonwealth Games